West Virginia Route 27 is an east–west state highway located within the Northern Panhandle county of Brooke in West Virginia. The western terminus of the route is at West Virginia Route 2 in Wellsburg. The eastern terminus is at the Pennsylvania state line five miles (8 km) east of Wellsburg, where WV 27 continues east into the border town of Independence as Pennsylvania Route 844.

Major intersections

WV 27 Alternate

West Virginia Route 27 Alternate is an east–west state highway located within the Northern Panhandle county of Brooke in West Virginia. The western terminus of the route is at West Virginia Route 2 in Follansbee. The eastern terminus is at the Pennsylvania state line near Eldersville, Pennsylvania where the road continues as Eldersville Road (State Route 4008).

Unlike most alternate state routes, Alternate WV 27 does not connect with its parent WV 27 route.  Approximately four miles of WV Route 2 separate the western termini of both routes.

Major intersections

References

027
Transportation in Brooke County, West Virginia